The First Optional Protocol to the International Covenant on Civil and Political Rights is an international treaty establishing an individual complaint mechanism for the International Covenant on Civil and Political Rights (ICCPR). It was adopted by the UN General Assembly on 16/12/1966, and entered into force on 23/03/1976. As of January 2023, it had 117 state parties and 35 signatories. Two of the ratifying states (Jamaica and Trinidad and Tobago) have denounced the protocol.

Summary

The Optional Protocol establishes an individual complaints mechanism for the ICCPR similar to those of the Optional Protocol to the Convention on the Rights of Persons with Disabilities and Article 14 of the Convention on the Elimination of All Forms of Racial Discrimination. Parties agree to recognise the competence of the UN Human Rights Committee (HRC) to consider complaints from individuals who claim their rights under the Covenant have been  violated. Several complainants  must have exhausted all domestic remedies, and anonymous complaints are not permitted. The Committee must bring complaints to the attention of the relevant party, which must respond within six months. Following consideration, the Committee must forward its conclusions to the party and the complainant.

While not expressly provided for in the Protocol, the HRC regards the recognition of its competence to hear complaints as imposing an obligation not to hinder access to the Committee and to prevent any retaliation against complainants. It regards its findings as authoritative determinations of obligations under the Covenant, and their adoption as being required in order to provide an "effective remedy" under Article 2 of the ICCPR.

The Optional Protocol required ten ratifications to come into force.

Reservations

A number of parties have made reservations and interpretative declarations to their application of the Optional Protocol.

Austria does not recognise the jurisdiction of the HRC to consider complaints which have already been examined by the European Commission on Human Rights.

Chile, Croatia, El Salvador, France, Germany, Guatemala, Malta, Russia, Slovenia, Sri Lanka, and Turkey consider the Optional Protocol to only apply to complaints which arose after it entered into force for those countries.

Croatia, Denmark, France, Germany, Iceland, Ireland, Italy, Luxembourg, Malta, Norway, Poland, Romania, Russia, Slovenia, Spain, Sri Lanka, Sweden, Turkey and Uganda do not recognise the jurisdiction of the HRC to consider complaints which have already been considered under another international complaint procedure.

Germany and Turkey do not recognise the jurisdiction of the HRC to hear complaints resulting from Article 26 of the ICCPR, covering discrimination and equality before the law, except insofar as they relate to rights expressly affirmed in the Covenant.

Guyana and Trinidad and Tobago do not recognise the jurisdiction of the HRC to hear complaints relating to their use of the death penalty.

Venezuela does not recognise the competence of the HRC to hear complaints regarding in-absentia trials for offences against the republic.

Decisions
 Toonen v. Australia (1994) – held that sexual orientation was included in the treaty's antidiscrimination provisions as a protected status.
 Waldman v. Canada (1999) – religious discrimination in school funding.
 Diergaardt v. Namibia (2000) – linguistic discrimination in communication with authorities.
 Ignatāne v. Latvia (2001) – non-objective way of evaluating official language skills of a candidate in elections.
 Ioane Teitiota v. New Zealand (2020) - Without robust national and international efforts, the effects of climate change in receiving states may expose individuals to a violation of their rights under articles 6 or 7 of the Covenant, thereby triggering the non-refoulement obligations of sending states. However, it was not the case in this particular case.

See also
 Optional Protocol to the Convention on the Elimination of All Forms of Discrimination against Women
 Optional Protocol to the Convention on the Rights of Persons with Disabilities
 Optional Protocol to the Convention on the Rights of the Child on a Communications Procedure
 Optional Protocol to the International Covenant on Economic, Social and Cultural Rights
 Second Optional Protocol to the International Covenant on Civil and Political Rights

References

External links
 Text of the Optional Protocol
 List of parties
 Human Rights Committee, the Protocol's monitoring body.

Human rights instruments
Treaties concluded in 1966
Treaties entered into force in 1976
United Nations treaties
Treaties of Albania
Treaties of Algeria
Treaties of Andorra
Treaties of the People's Republic of Angola
Treaties of Argentina
Treaties of Armenia
Treaties of Australia
Treaties of Austria
Treaties of Azerbaijan
Treaties of Barbados
Treaties of Belarus
Treaties of the Byelorussian Soviet Socialist Republic
Treaties of Belgium
Treaties of Benin
Treaties of Bolivia
Treaties of Bosnia and Herzegovina
Treaties of Brazil
Treaties of Bulgaria
Treaties of Burkina Faso
Treaties of Cameroon
Treaties of Canada
Treaties of Cape Verde
Treaties of the Central African Republic
Treaties of Chad
Treaties of Chile
Treaties of Colombia
Treaties of the Republic of the Congo
Treaties of Costa Rica
Treaties of Ivory Coast
Treaties of Croatia
Treaties of Cyprus
Treaties of Czechoslovakia
Treaties of the Czech Republic
Treaties of Zaire
Treaties of Denmark
Treaties of Djibouti
Treaties of the Dominican Republic
Treaties of Ecuador
Treaties of El Salvador
Treaties of Equatorial Guinea
Treaties of Estonia
Treaties of Finland
Treaties of France
Treaties of the Gambia
Treaties of Georgia (country)
Treaties of Germany
Treaties of Ghana
Treaties of Greece
Treaties of Guatemala
Treaties of Guinea
Treaties of Guinea-Bissau
Treaties of Guyana
Treaties of Honduras
Treaties of the Hungarian People's Republic
Treaties of Iceland
Treaties of Ireland
Treaties of Italy
Treaties of Kazakhstan
Treaties of Kyrgyzstan
Treaties of Latvia
Treaties of Lesotho
Treaties of the Libyan Arab Jamahiriya
Treaties of Liechtenstein
Treaties of Lithuania
Treaties of Luxembourg
Treaties of Madagascar
Treaties of Malawi
Treaties of the Maldives
Treaties of Mali
Treaties of Malta
Treaties of Mauritius
Treaties of Mexico
Treaties of the Mongolian People's Republic
Treaties of Montenegro
Treaties of Namibia
Treaties of Nepal
Treaties of the Netherlands
Treaties of New Zealand
Treaties of Niger
Treaties of Nicaragua
Treaties of Norway
Treaties of Panama
Treaties of Paraguay
Treaties of Peru
Treaties of the Philippines
Treaties of Poland
Treaties of Portugal
Treaties of South Korea
Treaties of Moldova
Treaties of Romania
Treaties of Russia
Treaties of San Marino
Treaties of Seychelles
Treaties of Senegal
Treaties of Serbia and Montenegro
Treaties of Sierra Leone
Treaties of Slovakia
Treaties of Slovenia
Treaties of the Somali Democratic Republic
Treaties of South Africa
Treaties of the Soviet Union
Treaties of Spain
Treaties of Sri Lanka
Treaties of Saint Vincent and the Grenadines
Treaties of Suriname
Treaties of Sweden
Treaties of Tajikistan
Treaties of North Macedonia
Treaties of Trinidad and Tobago
Treaties of Tunisia
Treaties of Turkey
Treaties of Turkmenistan
Treaties of Uganda
Treaties of Ukraine
Treaties of the Ukrainian Soviet Socialist Republic
Treaties of Uruguay
Treaties of Uzbekistan
Treaties of Venezuela
Treaties of Yugoslavia
Treaties of Zambia
1966 in New York City
Treaties adopted by United Nations General Assembly resolutions
Treaties extended to the Netherlands Antilles
Treaties extended to Aruba
Treaties extended to the Faroe Islands
Treaties extended to Greenland